Woke Up Like This is a 2017 Philippine comedy film, directed by John Elbert Ferrer, is a film by Regal Films, starring Vhong Navarro and Lovi Poe, and was released nationwide on August 23, 2017. It is the film between Navarro and Poe after the Unwanted episode from Shake, Rattle and Roll Fourteen: The Invasion in 2012.

Plot
The film about two individuals who switched bodies.

Cast
Main cast
 Vhong Navarro as Nando Cruz
 Lovi Poe as Sabrina Rodriguez

Supporting cast
 Joey Marquez as Tsong/Tatay
 Bayani Agbayani as Daiko
 Lou Veloso as Beggar/Apo
 Raikko Mateo as Jolly
 Coraleen Waddell as Kitty
 Alyana Asistio as Hello
 Johnny Revilla as Sabrina's Father
 Dionne Monsanto 
 Mitoy Yonting

Guest cast
 Billy Crawford
 Teddy Corpuz
 Vice Ganda
 LA Tenorio
 Alex Calleja
 Arwind Santos (erroneously credited as Arwin Santos)

Production
Woke Up Like This was announced to the public as early as March 2017. The Joel Ferrer-directed film was produced by Regal Films while its script was made by Joma Labayen and Jeps Gallon.

Release
The grand premiere for Woke Up Like This took place on August 21, 2017.

Reception
The film garnered  box office gross in five days according to an August 29, 2017, report. By September 1, 2017, the film already grossed  at the box office.

See also
 Da Possessed
 Mang Kepweng Returns
 The Bride and the Lover
 White House

References

External links
 

2017 films
Philippine comedy films
Body swapping in films